The Colotepec River is a river of Mexico.

See also
List of rivers of Mexico

References

Atlas of Mexico, 1975

Rivers of Mexico